Niedorp (West Frisian: Nierup) is a former municipality in the north-western Netherlands, in the province of North Holland and the region of West-Frisia. Niedorp, as well as Barsingerhorn, located in the former municipality of Niedorp, received city rights in 1415. Since 2012 Niedorp is a part of the new municipality of Hollands Kroon.

Population centres 

The former municipality of Niedorp consisted of the following cities, towns, villages and/or districts: Barsingerhorn, Haringhuizen, Kolhorn, Lutjewinkel, Nieuwe Niedorp, Oude Niedorp, 't Veld, Winkel, Zijdewind.

Archaeology
Prehistoric settlements from the Late Neolithic were found in De Gouw and the Groetpolder. They are covered by sediment and belong to the Single Grave Culture. In 1995, these sites were submitted to UNESCO's list of World Heritage Sites. They are currently on the tentative list.

Local government 
The former municipal council of Niedorp consisted of 15 seats, which were divided as follows:

 PvdA - 5 seats
 VVD - 4 seats
 Algemeen Belang - 3 seats
 CDA - 3 seats

References 
 Statistics are taken from the SDU Staatscourant

External links

City Site (Dutch)
Nieuws over Niedorp (Dutch)
Alles over Schagen FM, de lokale omroep voor Schagen, Zijpe, Niedorp en Harenkarspel (Dutch)

Municipalities of the Netherlands disestablished in 2012
Former municipalities of North Holland
Hollands Kroon